The name Zoe has been used for two tropical cyclones in the Southwestern Pacific Ocean.

Cyclone Zoe (1974) – Existed just off the Queensland coast and made a landfall near Brisbane.
Cyclone Zoe (2002) – One of the most intense tropical cyclones ever observed in the South Pacific, reached Category 5 strength and affected several of the Solomon Islands.

Australian region cyclone set index articles
South Pacific cyclone set index articles